Leef Township is located in Madison County, Illinois, in the United States. As of the 2010 census, its population was 628 and it contained 246 housing units.

History
Leef Township was named for the Swiss immigrant Jacob Leu, who anglicized his name to Leef.

Geography

Demographics

References

External links
City-data.com
Illinois State Archives

Townships in Madison County, Illinois
Townships in Illinois